The following is a list of Tax Commissioners of North Dakota since the office was created in 1919. The office was an appointed position from 1919 to 1940, and an elected position on the no-party ballot from 1940 to 1987, and an elected position on a party ballot since 1987.

Party information given for the commissioners who served before 1940 is based on the party of the Governor of North Dakota who appointed them to the position. From 1940 to 1987, the office became an elected position, but was placed on the no party ballot. Since 1987, the office has been placed on a party-affiliated ballot.

See also
North Dakota Tax Commissioner
Political party strength in North Dakota

Notes

External links
State of North Dakota official website

Government of North Dakota
Tax
North Dakota Tax Commissioners